During the reign of the Roman Emperor Constantine the Great (AD 306–337), Christianity began to transition to the dominant religion of the Roman Empire. Historians remain uncertain about Constantine's reasons for favoring Christianity, and theologians and historians have often argued about which form of early Christianity he subscribed to. There is no consensus among scholars as to whether he adopted his mother Helena's Christianity in his youth, or, as claimed by Eusebius of Caesarea, encouraged her to convert to the faith he had adopted. 

Constantine ruled the Roman Empire as sole emperor for much of his reign. Some scholars allege that his main objective was to gain unanimous approval and submission to his authority from all classes, and therefore he chose Christianity to conduct his political propaganda, believing that it was the most appropriate religion that could fit with the imperial cult. Regardless, under the Constantinian dynasty Christianity expanded throughout the empire, launching the era of the state church of the Roman Empire. Whether Constantine sincerely converted to Christianity or remained loyal to paganism is a matter of debate among historians. His formal conversion in 312 is almost universally acknowledged among historians, despite that it was claimed he was baptized only on his deathbed by the Arian bishop Eusebius of Nicomedia in 337; the real reasons behind it remain unknown and are debated also. According to Hans Pohlsander, professor emeritus of history at the University at Albany, SUNY, Constantine's conversion was just another instrument of realpolitik in his hands meant to serve his political interest in keeping the empire united under his control:

Constantine's decision to cease the persecution of Christians in the Roman Empire was a turning point for early Christianity, sometimes referred to as the Triumph of the Church, the Peace of the Church or the Constantinian shift. In 313, Constantine and Licinius issued the Edict of Milan decriminalizing Christian worship. The emperor became a great patron of the Church and set a precedent for the position of the Christian emperor within the Church and raised the notions of orthodoxy, Christendom, ecumenical councils, and the state church of the Roman Empire declared by edict in 380. He is revered as a saint and isapostolos in the Eastern Orthodox Church, Oriental Orthodox Church, and various Eastern Catholic Churches for his example as a Christian monarch.

Before Constantine
The first recorded official persecution of Christians on behalf of the Roman Empire was in AD 64, when, as reported by the Roman historian Tacitus, Emperor Nero attempted to blame Christians for the Great Fire of Rome. According to Church tradition, it was during the reign of Nero that Peter and Paul were martyred in Rome. However, modern historians debate whether the Roman government distinguished between Christians and Jews prior to Nerva's modification of the Fiscus Judaicus in 96, from which point practising Jews paid the tax and Christians did not.

Christians suffered from sporadic and localized persecutions over a period of two and a half centuries. Their refusal to participate in the imperial cult was considered an act of treason and was thus punishable by execution. The most widespread official persecution was carried out by Diocletian beginning in 303. During the Great Persecution, the emperor ordered Christian buildings and the homes of Christians torn down and their sacred books collected and burned. Christians were arrested, tortured, mutilated, burned, starved, and condemned to gladiatorial contests to amuse spectators. The Great Persecution officially ended in April 311, when Galerius, senior emperor of the Tetrarchy, issued an edict of toleration which granted Christians the right to practice their religion, although it did not restore any property to them. Constantine, caesar in the Western Empire, and Licinius, caesar in the East, also were signatories to the edict. It has been speculated that Galerius' reversal of his long-standing policy of Christian persecution has been attributable to one or both of these co-caesars.

Constantine's Conversion
It is possible (but not certain) that Constantine's mother, Helena, exposed him to Christianity. In any case, he only declared himself a Christian after issuing the Edict of Milan. Writing to Christians, Constantine made clear that he believed that he owed his successes to the protection of the High God alone.

Vision of Apollo 

In 310 a panegyric, preserved in the Panegyrici Latini collection and delivered at Trier for the joint occasion of the city's birthday and Constantine's quinquennalia, recounted a vision apparently seen by the emperor while journeying between Marseille and Trier. The panegyricist recounts that the god Apollo appeared to Constantine in company with Victoria and together presented him with three wreaths representing thirty years of power. This vision was perhaps in a dream experienced by the emperor while practising incubation at the shrine of Apollo Grannus in Grand, Vosges. Eusebius was aware of this vision, or reports of it, and refers in his own Panegyric of Constantine of 336 to "tricennial crowns" bestowed by the hand of God in Christianity on Constantine, "augmenting the sway of his kingdom by long years".

Battle of Milvian Bridge 

Eusebius of Caesarea and other Christian sources record that Constantine experienced a dramatic series of events sometime between his father Constantius I's death in 306 and the Battle of the Milvian Bridge on 28 October 312. The battle secured Constantine's claim to the title of augustus in the West, which he had assumed unilaterally when his father died. According to the Eusebius' Life of Constantine, Constantine saw a vision of "a cross-shaped trophy formed from light" above the sun at midday.

The Greek words "" (in this sign, conquer) are often rendered in a Latin version, "in hoc signo vinces" (in this sign, you will conquer). According to Eusebius, Constantine also had a dream that same night. In the dream,

Writing his Church History shortly after 313, Eusebius makes no mention of this story in that work and does not recount it until composing his posthumous biography of Constantine decades afterwards. Life of Constantine was written by Eusebius after Constantine had died, and Eusebius admitted that he had heard the story from Constantine long after it had happened. Lactantius, writing 313–315 and around twenty years before Eusebius's Life, also does not mention a vision in the sky. Instead, Lactantius mentions only that Constantine's dream took place on the eve of the climactic battle on the Pons Milvius across the Tiber, with the crucial detail that the "sign" was marked on the Constantinian soldiers' shields. According to Lactantius:

It is unclear from these sources what Constantine saw and what was marked on his army's shields. Eusebius's description of the daytime vision suggests a cross-shaped (either Τ or †) symbol, whereas Lactantius's description suggests a staurogram (⳨), although the crux ansata (☥) or the Egyptian hieroglyph ankh (𓋹) have been proposed as interpretations as well. All of these symbols were used by Christians in the 3rd and 4th centuries. Eusebius concurs with Lactantius that a new device was added to Constantine's soldiers' shields but does not connect this with the Battle of the Milvian Bridge, saying only that the "sign of the saving trophy" was marked, but not specifying when. Sometime after 317, Eusebius was permitted by Constantine, probably either in 325 or in 335, to see a standard that was made according to the emperor's dreamt instructions during the civil war. He described it as:

Possibly Eusebius's description refers to a chi-rho inside the loop of an ankh.

Following the battle and the defeat and death of Maxentius, Constantine became the undisputed emperor in the West and performed an adventus, a ceremonial entrance to the city. Arriving inside Rome's walls he ignored the altars to the gods prepared on the Capitoline Hill and did not carry out the customary sacrifices to celebrate a general's victorious entry into Rome, instead heading directly to the imperial palace. This is probably because the traditional Roman triumph, concluding with the sacrifice to Jupiter Optimus Maximus at his temple on the Capitoline, was traditionally celebrated after victory over Rome's enemies, rather than after the conquest of the city by a claimant in a civil war. The Arch of Constantine, for which numerous reliefs from earlier monuments depicting prior emperors sacrificing to various gods were re-carved with the face of Constantine, does not have an image of Constantine sacrificing to Jupiter, although he is shown sacrificing to Apollo and to Hercules.

Edict of Milan
In 313 Constantine and Licinius announced "that it was proper that the Christians and all others should have liberty to follow that mode of religion which to each of them appeared best," thereby granting tolerance to all religions, including Christianity. The Edict of Milan went a step further than the earlier Edict of Serdica by Galerius in 311, returning confiscated Church property. This edict made the empire officially neutral with regard to religious worship; it neither made the traditional religions illegal nor made Christianity the state religion, as occurred later with the Edict of Thessalonica of 380. The Edict of Milan did, however, raise the stock of Christianity within the empire and reaffirmed the importance of religious worship to the welfare of the state. Most influential people in the empire, especially high military officials, had not been converted to Christianity and still participated in the traditional religions of Rome; Constantine's rule exhibited at least a willingness to appease these factions. The Roman coins minted up to eight years after the battle still bore the images of Roman gods. The monuments he first commissioned, such as the Arch of Constantine, contained no reference to Christianity.

Patronage of the Church

The accession of Constantine was a turning point for early Christianity. After his victory, Constantine took over the role of patron of the Christian faith. He supported the Church financially, had a number of basilicas built, granted privileges (e.g., exemption from certain taxes) to clergy, promoted Christians to high-ranking offices, returned property confiscated during the Great Persecution of Diocletian, and endowed the church with land and other wealth. Between 324 and 330, Constantine built a new city, New Rome, at Byzantium on the Bosporos, which would be named Constantinople for him. Unlike "old" Rome, the city began to employ overtly Christian architecture, contained churches within the city walls, and had no pre-existing temples from other religions.

In doing this, however, Constantine required those who had not converted to Christianity to pay for the new city. Christian chroniclers tell that it appeared necessary to Constantine "to teach his subjects to give up their rites ... and to accustom them to despise their temples and the images contained therein," This led to the closure of temples because of a lack of support, their wealth flowing to the imperial treasure; Constantine did not need to use force to implement this. It was the chronicler Theophanes who added centuries later that temples "were annihilated", but this was considered "not true" by contemporary historians.

Constantine respected cultivated persons, and his court was composed of older, respected, and honored men. Men from leading Roman families who declined to convert to Christianity were denied positions of power yet still received appointments; even up to the end of his life, two-thirds of his top government were non-Christian. Constantine's laws enforced and reflected his Christian attitudes. Crucifixion was abolished for reasons of Christian piety but was replaced with hanging, to demonstrate the preservation of Roman supremacy. On March 7, 321, Sunday, which was sacred to Christians as the day of Christ's resurrection and to the Roman Sun God Sol Invictus, was declared an official day of rest. On that day markets were banned and public offices were closed, except for the purpose of freeing slaves. There were, however, no restrictions on performing farming work on Sundays, which was the work of the great majority of the population.

Some laws made during his reign were even humane in the modern sense and supported tolerance, possibly inspired by his Christianity: a prisoner was no longer to be kept in total darkness but must be given the outdoors and daylight; a condemned man was allowed to die in the arena, but he could not be branded on his "heavenly beautified" face, since God was supposed to have made man in his image, but only on the feet. Publicly displayed gladiatorial games were ordered to be eliminated in 325.

Early Christian Bibles

According to Eusebius, in 331 Constantine had commissioned him to deliver fifty volumes of scriptures for the churches of Constantinople, which were to be bound in leather and easily portable. Only three or four churches are known certainly to have existed in Constantine's reign, but others appear to have been planned or established, for which the scriptures were commissioned. The volumes were likely gospel books containing the Canonical Gospels of the Four Evangelists rather than complete Bibles with the entire Biblical canon, which were very rare in antiquity.

Athanasius (Apol. Const. 4) recorded around 340 Alexandrian scribes preparing Bibles for Constans. Little else is known. It has been speculated that this may have provided motivation for canon lists, and that Codex Vaticanus and Codex Sinaiticus are examples of these Bibles. Together with the Peshitta and Codex Alexandrinus, these are the earliest extant Christian Bibles.

Church construction 
According to Socrates Scholasticus, Constantine commissioned the construction of the first Church of Hagia Irene in Constantinople, on the site now occupied by the Justinian church of the same name. It commemorated the peace won by Constantine and Crispus's victory over Licinius and Licinius II at the Battle of Chrysopolis in 324; its name, the Church of the Holy Peace recalled the Altar of Peace built by Augustus, the first deified Roman emperor. Two other large churches were dedicated to Saint Mocius and to Saint Acacius; both worthies had supposedly been martyred in Byzantium during the Diocletianic Persecution. The Church of St Mocius was supposed to have included parts of a former temple of Zeus or Hercules, though it is unlikely that such a temple existed on the site, which was without the walls of the Constantinian city as well as of erstwhile Severan Byzantium. According to Eusebius, Christian liturgies were also performed in Constantine's Mausoleum, the site of which became the Church of the Holy Apostles; although Eusebius does not mention any Byzantine church by name, he reports that Christian sites were numerous inside the city and around it. Later tradition ascribed to Constantine the foundations in Constantinople of the Church of Saint Menas, the Church of Saint Agathonicus, the Church of Saint Michael at nearby Anaplous, and the Church of Hagios Dynamis.

Christian emperorship

Enforcement of doctrine 

The reign of Constantine established a precedent for the position of the Christian emperor in the Church. Emperors considered themselves responsible to the gods for the spiritual health of their subjects, and after Constantine they had a duty to help the Church define and maintain orthodoxy. The Church generally regarded the definition of doctrine as the responsibility of the bishops; the emperor's role was to enforce doctrine, root out heresy, and uphold ecclesiastical unity. The emperor ensured that God was properly worshiped in his empire; what proper worship (orthodoxy) and doctrines and dogma consisted of was for the Church to determine.

Constantine had become a worshiper of the Christian God, but he found that there were many opinions on that worship and indeed on who and what that God was. In 316, Constantine was asked to adjudicate in a North African dispute of the Donatist sect (who began by refusing obedience to any bishops who had yielded in any way to persecution, later regarding all bishops but their own sect as utterly contaminated). More significantly, in 325 he summoned the First Council of Nicaea, effectively the first ecumenical council (unless the Council of Jerusalem is so classified). The Council of Nicaea is the first major attempt by Christians to define orthodoxy for the whole Church. Until Nicaea, all previous Church councils had been local or regional synods affecting only portions of the Church.

Nicaea dealt primarily with the Arian controversy. Constantine was torn between the Arian and Trinitarian camps. After the Nicene council, and against its conclusions, he eventually recalled Arius from exile and banished Athanasius of Alexandria to Trier.

Just before his death in May 337, it is claimed that Constantine was baptised into Christianity. Up until this time he had been a catechumen for most of his adult life. He believed that if he waited to get baptized on his death bed he was in less danger of polluting his soul with sin and not getting to heaven. He was baptized by his distant relative Arian Bishop Eusebius of Nicomedia or by Pope Sylvester I which is maintained by the Catholic Church, the Coptic Orthodox Church, the Antiochian Orthodox Church, the Greek Orthodox Church, the Russian Orthodox Church, the Serbian Orthodox Church, upon by many other Eastern Orthodox, Nestorian Orthodox, and Oriental Orthodox Churches. During Eusebius of Nicomedia's time in the imperial court, the Eastern court and the major positions in the Eastern Church were held by Arians or Arian sympathizers. With the exception of a short period of eclipse, Eusebius enjoyed the complete confidence both of Constantine and Constantius II and was the tutor of Emperor Julian the Apostate. After Constantine's death, his son and successor Constantius II was an Arian, as was Emperor Valens.

Suppression of other religions

Constantine's position on the religions traditionally practiced in Rome evolved during his reign. In fact, his coinage and other official motifs, until 325, had affiliated him with the pagan cult of Sol Invictus. At first, Constantine encouraged the construction of new temples and tolerated traditional sacrifices; by the end of his reign, he had begun to order the pillaging and tearing down of Roman temples.

Beyond the limes, east of the Euphrates, the Sasanian rulers, perennially at war with Rome, had usually tolerated Christianity. Constantine is said to have written to Shapur II in 324 and urged him to protect Christians under his rule. With the establishment of Christianity as the state religion of the Roman Empire, Christians in Persia would be regarded as allies of Persia's ancient enemy. According to an anonymous Christian account, Shapur II wrote to his generals:

Constantinian shift
Constantinian shift is a term used by some theologians and historians of antiquity to describe the political and theological aspects and outcomes of the 4th-century process of Constantine's integration of the imperial government with the Church that began with the First Council of Nicaea. The term was popularized by the Mennonite theologian John H. Yoder. The claim that there ever was a Constantinian shift has been disputed; Peter Leithart argues that there was a "brief, ambiguous 'Constantinian moment' in the fourth century," but that there was "no permanent, epochal 'Constantinian shift'."

See also
 Constantinianism
 Bishops of Rome under Constantine the Great
 Christian pacifism
 Labarum
 List of rulers who converted to Christianity
 Philip the Arab and Christianity

References

Further reading
 Eusebius, Life of Constantine, Introduction, translation, and commentary by Averil Cameron and Stuart G. Hall, Oxford: Clarendon Press, 1999.
 Ramsay MacMullen, Christianizing The Roman Empire A.D. 100–400, Yale University Press, 1984 ,

External links
The Full Text of the "Edict of Milan"

 
4th-century Christianity
Ancient Christian controversies
Christianization
Religious views by individual